Ayhan Kaynak (born 4 March 1967) is a Turkish former footballer who played one season in the Süper Lig with Adana Demirspor.

Professional career
Ayhan made his professional debut with Adana Demirspor in a 2–1 Süper Lig win over Karşıyaka S.K. on 11 June 1989. After his debut season with Adana Demirspor, Ayhan spent the rest of his career in the lower divisions in Turkey.

Personal life
Ayhan was born in to a large family of 8 children. His brothers Orhan, Reşit, İrfan, Kayhan and İlhan were all professional footballers.

References

External links
 
 

1967 births
Living people
People from Adana
Turkish footballers
Adana Demirspor footballers
Alanyaspor footballers
Bucaspor footballers
Sarıyer S.K. footballers
Kartalspor footballers
Süper Lig players
TFF First League players
TFF Second League players
Association football midfielders